Dublin Airport (Irish: Aerfort Bhaile Átha Cliath)  is an international airport serving Dublin, Ireland. It is operated by DAA (formerly Dublin Airport Authority).
In 2019, 32.9 million passengers passed through the airport, making it the airport's busiest year on record. It is the 12th busiest airport in Europe, and is the busiest of Ireland's airports by total passenger traffic; it also has the largest traffic levels on the island of Ireland, followed by Belfast International Airport.

The airport has an extensive short and medium haul network, served by an array of carriers, as well as a significant long-haul network focused on North America and the Middle East. It serves as the main hub for Ireland's flag carrier Aer Lingus, and is a primary operating base for Europe's largest low-cost carrier Ryanair. British charter airline TUI Airways also operates a base at the airport.

United States border preclearance services are available at the airport for U.S.-bound passengers. Shannon Airport is the only other airport in Europe to offer this facility.

History

Collinstown Aerodrome
The airport began as a wartime aerodrome located in the townland of Collinstown, Fingal. In 1917, during World War I, Collinstown was selected as the base for the British Royal Flying Corps. By April 1918, when the Flying Corps was renamed the Royal Air Force, Collinstown Aerodrome was more than 20% complete. Construction was completed in 1919 when the Irish War of Independence broke out. On 20 March 1919, a group of 30 Irish Volunteers, including five employed by the RAF, stole 75 rifles and 5,000 rounds of ammunition from the base. As Collinstown Camp, the site was used for internment of Irish republicans. At the end of 1922, the land and buildings at Collinstown were transferred to the Irish Free State. The airfield fell into disrepair and grass grew on the former runways.

The beginnings in the 1930s and 1940s

In 1936, the Executive Council of the Irish Free State established a new civil airline — Aer Lingus — which began operating from Casement Aerodrome, at Baldonnel. A decision was made that a civil airport should replace Baldonnel as Dublin's airport. The Collinstown site was chosen and extended into the neighbouring townlands of Rock and Corballis.

Work on the new airport began in 1937. By the end of 1939, a grass airfield surface, internal roads, car parks and electrical power and lighting were set up. The inaugural flight from Dublin took place on 19 January 1940 to Liverpool. In August 1938, work began on a new airport terminal building. The terminal building was designed by architect Desmond FitzGerald, brother of politician Garret FitzGerald. FitzGerald, who had designed an airport terminal as part of his college studies, led a team of architects that also included Kevin Barry, Daithí Hanley, Charles Aliaga Kelly, Dermot O'Toole and Harry Robson. The terminal building opened in early 1941, with its design heavily influenced by the tiered structure of the luxury ocean liners of the time. The terminal was awarded the Triennial Gold Medal of the Royal Hibernian Institute of Architects in 1942 and is today a listed building.

Due to World War II, which was known as The Emergency in Ireland, services were severely restricted at Dublin Airport until late 1945. The only international scheduled routes operated during this time were by Aer Lingus to Liverpool (and for a period to Manchester's Barton Aerodrome). The end of the war meant the beginning of a major expansion in services at the airport. Aer Lingus resumed its London service to Croydon in November 1945. In 1947, KLM started the first European flights to Dublin with a service to Amsterdam. Three new concrete runways were completed in 1948, and in 1950 - after ten years in operation - the airport had welcomed a total of 920,000 passengers.

Expanding in the 1950s, 1960s and 1970s
Throughout the 1950s Dublin Airport expanded with virtually uninterrupted traffic growth. Runway extensions and terminal enhancements were carried out to deal with the influx of traffic and passengers. New airlines began serving the airport also. These included British European Airways, Sabena, and BKS.

In 1958, a new transatlantic service was started by Aer Lingus via Shannon Airport. By the mid-1950s, it was clear that the original terminal building was too small to cope with growing passenger numbers. A new North Terminal was opened in June 1959. Originally, the plan was that North Terminal would handle all US and European flights, but instead, it became the arrivals terminal for all Dublin Airport passengers, while the original passenger terminal was used for departures.

During the 1960s, the number of scheduled carriers continued to grow. By the close of the 1960s, a sizeable number of Boeing 737s, BAC One-Elevens, Boeing 707s and Hawker Siddeley Tridents were using the airport regularly. In the late 1960s new departure gate piers were added close to the old terminal to cope with larger aircraft. These piers would subsequently be connected to Terminal 1. During 1969, the airport handled 1,737,151 passengers. In his 1969 book Irish Pubs of Character, Roy Bulson describes the restaurant in Dublin airport as "one of the best airport restaurants in Europe" which served a table d'hôte lunch from noon until 3pm, and hosted regular Saturday night dinner dances from October until April which had become very popular. The airport bar, The Shamrock Lounge, operated from 7am until 10:30pm and included a cocktail bar from which the patron could watch the arrival and departure of aircraft. A separate premises named the Fáilte Bar existed in the arrivals building.

The advent of wide-body aircraft posed opportunities and challenges for aviation. In 1971, Aer Lingus took delivery of two new Boeing 747 aircraft; the first one arrived in March and, shortly afterwards, performed a flyover above O'Connell Street in Dublin on Saint Patrick's Day; a third Boeing 747 was delivered later that decade. To cope with this, a new £10 million passenger terminal capable of handling six million passengers per year, which became known as Terminal 1, was opened in June 1972. The growth which was anticipated at Dublin's airport (and provided for through heavy investment by the airport and Aer Lingus) during the 1970s did not materialise immediately.

On 30 November 1975, one person was killed and eight others were injured when the airport was bombed by the Ulster Defence Association.

Continuing in the 1980s and 1990s
In 1983 Aer Lingus opened its 'Aer Lingus Commuter' division which took delivery of Shorts, Saab AB and Fokker turboprop aircraft to open regular daily domestic services to and from Ireland's smaller regional airports for the first time, as well as to serve existing routes to smaller regional airports in the United Kingdom. At various stages of its operations, flights were operated to several Irish regional airports to feed passengers into Aer Lingus's international network. These domestic destinations included Cork Airport, Shannon Airport (the "Shannon stopover"), Kerry Airport, Galway Airport, Ireland West Airport Knock, Waterford Airport, Sligo Airport and City of Derry Airport. Aer Lingus Commuter has since been re-absorbed into the main company. The domestic routes, with the exception of Dublin-Shannon, were taken over by Aer Arann. Most of these routes have since been discontinued as the development of the motorway network in Ireland has resulted in significant reductions in travelling time by road. Aer Lingus has continued with the remaining Dublin–UK flights.

During the 1980s, major competition, especially on the Dublin–London routes, resulted in passenger numbers swelling to 5.1 million in 1989. In the same year a new  runway and a state-of-the-art air traffic control centre were opened. Dublin Airport continued to expand rapidly in the 1990s, with 5.5 million passengers in 1991. Pier A, which had been the first extension to the old terminal building, was significantly extended. A new Pier C, complete with air bridges, was built and as soon as this was completed, work commenced to extend it to double its capacity. The ground floor of the original terminal building was returned to passenger service after many years to provide additional departure gates. Pier D, completed in October 2007, is a dedicated low-fares boarding area and provides 14 quick turn-around stands and departure gates; these are not served by air bridges.

The Bilateral Air Transport Agreement

In 1993, a major milestone for the airport was the signing of a new United States – Ireland bilateral agreement which allowed airlines to operate some direct transatlantic services for the first time to/from Dublin Airport instead of touching down en route at Shannon Airport on the west coast of Ireland. (Shannon had once been a major transatlantic refuelling stop for pre-jet aircraft, and this agreement was designed to protect the interests of the Shannon region when modern jets no longer required a refuelling stop and Shannon saw a fall-off in traffic.) Airlines still had to provide an equal number of flights either to or through Shannon as to Dublin. A gradual further watering down of Shannon's so-called 'stopover' status came into effect in November 2006 when more direct flights to Dublin were allowed. The stopover requirement disappeared completely in 2008. At that time, airlines were allowed to fly direct to the US from Dublin without having to match these with any to/from Shannon. It was expected that this would result in a huge increase in services between Dublin and the US and Aer Lingus identified 16 destinations that it would like to serve directly from Dublin.

Recent history
With the success of Ireland's 'Celtic Tiger' economy, Dublin Airport saw growth in the 1990s and 2000s. This demand was driven by an increased demand for business travel to and from the country, together with an increase in inward tourism and a surge in demand for foreign holidays and city breaks from the Irish.

The demand from Ireland's migrant workers, principally those from Eastern Europe, has resulted in a large number of new routes opening to destinations in the European Union accession states. Ireland was one of only three European Union countries (as well as the United Kingdom and Sweden) to open its borders freely to workers from the ten accession states that joined the European Union in 2004.

In 2007 the then shortest runway, 11/29, was closed and converted to an aircraft storage area. This runway would subsequently be demolished for the construction of a second long runway parallel to 10/28.

The airport saw significant declines in traffic in 2009 and 2010, although since 2011 the airport has seen an increase in traffic. During 2012, this increase continued with passenger numbers growing by 1.9%. During 2013, passenger numbers at Dublin Airport were above the 20 million mark for the first time since 2009 with a 5.6% increase year on year. During 2014, this positive trend continued with an 8% increase over 2013. As of early December 2015, passenger figures have increased by 16% compared to 2014, and the previous record of 23.46 million passengers set in 2008 has already been passed. 2019 was the airport's busiest year, recording 32.9 million passengers - an increase in passenger numbers by 4% during the year. Long-haul passenger numbers increased by 4% to almost 5.2 million, while Short-haul traffic increased by 5% to 27.7 million.

In August 2019, Dublin Airport was chosen for the Special Achievement in Geographic Information Systems (GIS) award for its use of mapping software from ESRI Ireland.

Due to the pandemic and its impact, the airport lost 115 routes, as in January 2021, it scheduled flights to just 85 cities, down from 200 before the crisis began.

In February 2023, a spate of drone sightings around the airport led to cancellations of flights on separate days. It is illegal to operate a drone within 5 kilometers of an Irish airfield. DAA called for the Garda Síochana to introduce a counter-drone system as operated in the UK, and for the government to increase sentences for offenders.

Long-haul traffic
As of August 2019, there are services to 31 intercontinental destinations from Dublin Airport (not including Anatolia). In 2007, Etihad Airways began operating between Dublin Airport and Abu Dhabi, and increased its capacity to 14 weekly flights in March 2010. In addition, Emirates has served Dublin from Dubai since January 2012. A total of 22 cities in North America are connected directly to Dublin Airport by seven airlines. In 2015, Ethiopian Airlines began serving Dublin from Addis Ababa, thus inaugurating the first direct air link between Ireland and Sub-Saharan Africa. In 2017, Qatar Airways commenced a daily service to Dublin Airport from Doha.

Services to East Asia

The Government of Ireland, owner of Dublin Airport, and the Dublin Airport Authority, its operator, have long sought to connect Dublin with East Asia by direct air service. Their plans were realized in 2018 when Cathay Pacific launched 4 weekly direct flights between Dublin and Hong Kong. This was followed by services to Beijing-Capital (via Edinburgh) and Shenzhen (nonstop), launched by Hainan Airlines in June 2018 and January 2019, respectively. In August 2019, however, Hainan Airlines withdrew from Dublin entirely. In September, due to the ongoing political unrest in Hong Kong, Cathay Pacific restricted its previously year-round Hong Kong route to the summer season only.

Shannon Stopover and Open Skies
In the mid twentieth century, the Irish government introduced a rule stating that all air traffic between Ireland and the United States must transit through Shannon Airport. In return, the United States government placed a limit of four airports in the US that Aer Lingus could operate to. On 22 March 2007, the Open skies agreement between the US and EU was ratified. This resulted in the immediate cancellation of the long-running 'Shannon Stopover' requirement, whereby the Irish government had insisted that 50% of all transatlantic flights between Ireland and the United States must pass through Shannon Airport.

US border preclearance
Dublin Airport is one of only two airports in Europe, and three outside the Americas, with United States border preclearance services for US-bound passengers (the other airports are Ireland's Shannon Airport and Abu Dhabi International Airport in the United Arab Emirates). Those traveling on nonstop flights to the United States complete immigration and customs procedures in Dublin prior to their departure, and are treated as domestic passengers on arrival.

Aer Rianta and DAA/Dublin Airport Authority

In October 2004, Aer Rianta (which is the Irish for 'Air Ways' or 'Air Tracks') was renamed Dublin Airport Authority plc, a result of the State Airports Act 2004. All assets and liabilities previously owned by Aer Rianta were transferred to Dublin Airport Authority. The State Airports Act 2004 also established new airport authorities at Shannon and Cork Airports. The Shannon Airport Authority and the Cork Airport Authority had separate boards of directors and were authorised under the Act to prepare business plans, which may have in time lead to their full separation from the Dublin Airport Authority. Following a decision by the Irish Government, Shannon Airport became a separate publicly owned airport on 31 December 2012.

In July 2013, the Dublin Airport Authority was officially renamed "DAA plc" by the Irish Government. The rename was principally to remove the "Dublin" and "Authority" elements of the name which were seen to have little relevance to the overall functions of DAA. The name change announced in July 2013 took effect on 6 November 2014.

As the largest gateway to Ireland, over 25 million passengers travelled through the airport in 2015, a 15% increase over the previous year. The main contributors to the growth in traffic in 2015 were the 23 new routes launched during the year and extra capacity on 40 existing services. Both long-haul and short-haul traffic increased by 15% in 2015. A record 8.9 million people travelled between Dublin Airport and Britain during 2015, which was a 14% increase on the previous year. Dublin Airport also welcomes more than one million passengers per annum from Northern Ireland and is a key international gateway for overseas visitors to Northern Ireland, whose largest airport is less than a quarter the size of Dublin in terms of passenger numbers.

Passenger terminals

Terminal 1

The current Terminal 1 building opened in 1972 was designed to handle five million passengers per year. The original design included a second pier which would have been identical to the current decagon-shaped boarding Pier B, but this was never built. A car park was originally located on the upper floor of the building and the access ramps are still in place but it was closed for security reasons in the 1970s and converted into offices. Terminal 1 has been regularly extended and improved over the last two decades. In October 2007, a new pier designed by Larry Oltmanns, while design director of the London office of Skidmore, Owings & Merrill, who also designed graphics for its interior, was opened to the north of Terminal 1. This pier caters for the majority of Ryanair flights. In 2009, a new extension featuring new food and retail outlets was added to the side of Terminal 1. Terminal 1 is currently home to all airlines except Aer Lingus, American Airlines, Delta Air Lines, Emirates and United Airlines.

Terminal 2

Terminal 2 is a 75,000 m2 (810,000 sq ft) terminal and pier (Pier E) which provides aircraft parking for 27 narrow body aircraft through 25 departure gates and 16 immigration desks which can handle up to 15 million passengers annually. The project was designed by Pascall+Watson architects and the total cost was €600 million. Aer Lingus is the main carrier operating at Terminal 2 and since its opening have developed a hub at Dublin primarily for traffic traveling between Europe and the United States. Terminal 2 is now the transatlantic gateway for flights to the United States as it features a US pre-clearance immigration facility which was previously housed in Terminal 1.

Construction of Terminal 2 began on 1 October 2007, and it was officially opened on 19 November 2010 by the then Taoiseach Brian Cowen T.D. The intended purpose of Terminal 2 was to house all long-haul carriers in addition to Aer Lingus; however significant growth in US traffic has resulted in most long haul carriers flying outside the United States remaining in Terminal 1. During the design of Terminal 2 provisions were made for an expanded check in hall and additional pier (Pier F) to cater for future growth. Terminal 2 also contains the United States immigration pre-clearance facility. Currently Aer Lingus, American Airlines, Delta Air Lines, Emirates and United Airlines operate from Terminal 2.

Safety and security

DAA has its own branch of the Airport Police Service which is mandated to provide aviation and general policing at the airport. The Airport Police Station is centrally located on the Arrivals road between Terminals 1 and 2. The airport also has its own Airport Fire and Rescue Service which provides cover to the entire campus, its roadways and lands.

The Office of the Revenue Commissioners provide a customs service to both passenger and cargo terminals, while the Department of Agriculture also has a presence in the airport. Irish Naturalisation and Immigration Service performs immigration checks on all international passengers arriving at the airport. The Gardaí also have a small sub-station located beside the old terminal.

In 2016 it was confirmed that Garda Armed Support Units (ASU) would be deployed overtly to patrol Dublin Airport and Dublin Port full-time on foot inside terminal buildings and via vehicles outside and surrounding the perimeter to counter the rising threat of terrorist attacks in Europe. The decision was made as a direct result of the 2016 Brussels bombings in Belgium.

Maintenance facilities
Aer Lingus, Ryanair, CityJet, Eirtech and Dublin Aerospace have aircraft maintenance hangars and facilities at Dublin Airport.

Other facilities
Our Lady Queen of Heaven, a Catholic church built in 1964, is in the airport.

Airport developments

New air traffic control complex

The construction of a new control complex was required, as the location, height and visibility of the existing tower would be inadequate to operate the planned 10L/28R Runway.

The new complex opened on 15 June 2022. At nearly 87 metres high, it is the tallest inhabited structure in Ireland. It has space for twelve operators as opposed to the five of the previous tower and a 360 degree view of the Airport and its surroundings. The new complex will be ideal for simultaneous operation of 10R/28L and 10L/28R.

The old control complex will become a contingent tower in case of emergency

New runway
After a delay of several years due to the global financial crisis and predictions of falling consumer demand, it was announced in April 2016 that a new runway would start construction in 2017 and to be completed by 2021.

On 8 October 2020, the existing runway 10/28 was redesignated as 10R/28L in anticipation of the new runway becoming 10L/28R.

The new runway measuring  opened on 24 August 2022 parallel to the existing runway 10R/28L, which opened (as runway 10/28) in 1989. Planning permission for the runway was originally granted in August 2007, with 31 planning conditions attached. In March 2009 the DAA announced in a proposal for consultation that the new runway may be built to a length of  following consultation with potential long-haul carriers. A runway of this length would allow direct flights from Dublin to the Far East. The runway cost in the region of €320 million. The airport also has invested heavily in extending aprons and creating rapid exit taxiways to derive maximum efficiency from the existing main runway. Runway 16/34 is most often used in the evening, depending on airport construction. In the day, 16/34 is generally used as a taxiway for aircraft utilizing runway 10R/28L. The first flight on the new runway was Ryanair flight FR1964 to Eindhoven at 11:00 UTC on 24 August 2022.

Airlines and destinations

Passenger

The following airlines offer regular scheduled and charter flights at Dublin Airport:

Cargo
The following airlines operate scheduled cargo services at Dublin Airport:

Statistics

Passenger numbers
Passenger numbers at Dublin Airport increased every year during the 10 years between 1998 and 2008, from around 11.6 million to over 23.4 million. Passenger numbers fell however during the subsequent two years to around 18.4 million in 2010, with a small increase to 18.7 million in 2011 and 19.1 million in 2012, then 2013 saw a significant increase of 5.6% to 20.2 million. In 2014, passenger numbers increased by almost 8% to over 21.7 million. Traffic growth of over 15% during 2015 resulted in passenger numbers exceeding 25 million for the first time. The previous record of 23.46 million (set in 2008) was exceeded during the first week of December 2015.

Graph

Table

Busiest routes

Ground transport

There is no rail link to Dublin city centre, and the public transport options to the city are taxis, buses and private transport.

Bus services
Dublin Airport is served by a large network of bus and coach routes, serving both the wider Dublin area and the rest of Ireland. More than 700 buses a day service Dublin Airport. In addition, Dublin Bus and Go-Ahead Ireland run local stopping services that serve such residential areas as Santry, Swords, Rathfarnham, Ballinteer, Sutton, Malahide, Beaumont, Harold's Cross, Drumcondra, Balbriggan, Skerries, Rush and Portmarnock, with routes 16, 33A, 41 and 102.

Aircoach offers a number of coach services from the Airport to the Dublin area, serving both the city centre and surrounding areas including Leopardstown, Sandyford, Bray and Dún Laoghaire.

Dublin Coach links Portlaoise and Red Cow Luas to Dublin Airport.

Dublin Express runs non-stop coach services to the city centre via the Port Tunnel, offering interchange with the rail network at Tara Street station as well as serving other city centre destinations such as Heuston Station the main railway station connecting to Cork, Waterford, Limerick and Galway etc.

Bus Éireann has 18 routes from Dublin Airport to places such as Waterford (X4), Drogheda (101/100X) and Dundalk (100X). Ulsterbus Goldline offer cross-border bus services, namely X1/X2 to Belfast. Translink solely operate services X3/X4 to Derry via either Monaghan and Omagh, or Armagh and Cookstown respectively.

Aircoach runs longer distance services to Cork City, Belfast, Athlone and Galway, whilst Citylink and Gobus offer services to Galway, Éirebus and JJ Kavanagh operate regular services to Limerick, Kilkenny and Waterford. Wexfordbus connects the airport with Wexford, and John McGinley Coaches also connects the airport with Donegal ending in Annagry.

Taxi
Taxis are available at taxi ranks located directly outside of Terminal 1 and Terminal 2.

Rail
There is no direct rail connection to Dublin Airport. However, Iarnród Éireann (Irish Rail) provide suburban and intercity railway services from Dublin Connolly and Dublin Heuston railway stations, and there are regular bus services from both stations to the airport. Some city bus services serve Drumcondra suburban railway station, which is on the Connolly to Maynooth railway line while the 102 route connects Dublin Airport to Sutton DART station. Bus services to Busáras/Dublin Connolly and Dublin Heuston railway stations connect with the Luas Red Line.

Proposed rail link
For many years, it was expected that Iarnród Éireann would extend the Dublin Area Rapid Transit (DART) to serve the airport. These plans were replaced with a proposal for an underground metro line, which would run from the city centre to Swords via the airport. The route for the line, Metro North, was announced in October 2006 and was proposed to connect with several other modes of transport. In 2011, it was announced that the Metro North plan would be deferred due to a lack of funding. As of March 2018, an updated plan suggested that the Metro line might "be open to the public from 2027" but that the details, line, route and timelines were all "subject to change as the final designs haven't been confirmed".

Accidents and incidents
 On 12 June 1967, Aer Turas Flight 612, a Bristol 170 Freighter 31E, crashed while performing a go-around after a failed landing. The two crew died in the crash.
 29 November 1975 the Ulster Defence Association planted two bombs inside the arrivals terminal, one bomb exploded and the other was made safe. The attack killed one person and wounded ten more.

See also
 Airport Police (Ireland)
 Dublin Airport drone incidents

References

Sources

External links

 
 Dublin Airport Authority
 
 

 
1940 establishments in Ireland
Airports established in 1940
Airports in the Republic of Ireland
Airports with United States border preclearance
Buildings and structures in Fingal
Transport in Fingal
Buildings listed on the Fingal Record of Protected Structures
Art Deco airports
Art Deco architecture in the Republic of Ireland